Stephen Owusu (26 October 1982 – 24 October 2020) was a Ghanaian footballer who played for Kenyan Premier League side Tusker as a striker.

He was born in Prestea on 26 October 1982. He was part of the team that won the 2016 Kenyan Premier League. He died on 24 October 2020 after a long illness at the age of 37, two days before his 38th birthday.

References

External links 

Heart of Lions Registered Players for the 2008/2009 Globacom Premier League Season

1982 births
2020 deaths
Ghanaian footballers
Association football forwards
Asante Kotoko S.C. players
Heart of Lions F.C. players
Ghanaian expatriate sportspeople in Tunisia
Expatriate footballers in Tunisia
Espérance Sportive de Tunis players
Ghanaian expatriates in Nigeria
Expatriate footballers in Nigeria
Sharks F.C. players
Ghanaian expatriate sportspeople in Kenya
Expatriate footballers in Kenya
Tusker F.C. players
Aduana Stars F.C. players
Ghana international footballers